Rashid Malallah (Arabic:راشد مال الله) (born 9 December 1987) is an Emirati footballer who plays as a defender.

Career

Al Fujairah
Malallah started his career at Al-Fujairah and is a product of their youth system.

Ittihak Klaba
In 2007 he signed with Ittihad Kalba and played seasons with them.

Baniyas
He left Ittihad Kalba and signed with Baniyas, but he did not play with them and the contract was broken on 25 July 2012.

Al-Nasr
On 1 August 2012 Malallah signed with Al-Nasr.

Ajman
On 12 February 2015 Malallah left Al-Nasr and signed with Ajman.

External links

References

1987 births
Living people
Emirati footballers
Fujairah FC players
Al-Ittihad Kalba SC players
Baniyas Club players
Al-Nasr SC (Dubai) players
Ajman Club players
UAE Pro League players
UAE First Division League players
Association football defenders
Place of birth missing (living people)